Chanson d'Aspremont (or simply Aspremont, or Agolant) is a 12th-century Old French chanson de geste (before 1190).  The poem comprises 11, 376 verses (unusually long for a chanson de geste), grouped into rhymed laisses.  The verses are decasyllables mixed with alexandrines.

In this tale, the African Saracen king Agolant and his son Aumon (Almons, Eaumond) invade Calabria and defy Charlemagne (Charles) through their messenger Balan (vv. 1ff; 604ff).  Charlemagne's troops come to fight them, but Charlemagne's nephew Roland is not allowed to join the battle due to his young age (referred to as "Rolandin", he is not considered a full adult). The armies reach Aspremont, and Charlemagne's paladins Naimes and Girart d'Eufrate prove their worth.

Roland joins the battle by arming himself with a rod and mounting a horse (vv. 4969–71), and later commandeering Duke Naime's horse Morel (vv. 5749–5755). Charlemagne fights Aumon in single combat, initially protected by a helm with a jewel on the nasal that even sustains blows from Aumon's sword Durendal (vv. 5894–95, 5937–47). But Aumon strips this helm away and Charlemagne is in mortal danger, when Roland arrives (v. 6009). Roland defeats Aumon and saves Charlemagne. Roland captures Aumon's sword Durendal and his horse Viellantif ("Wideawake", OF: Vielantiu), and his olifant (laisse 309, vv. 6075–80). Charles knights Roland, girding him with Durendal (laisse 377–8, vv. 7480–7510).

In the end, Agolant dies and Charlemagne returns in triumph, although future battles with a disloyal Girart d'Eufrate are predicted.

Versions of this chanson were extremely popular in England, Italy (see the adaptation by Andrea da Barberino) and even Scandinavia.

Explanatory notes

References
Citations

Bibliography

Geneviève Hasenohr and Michel Zink, eds.  Dictionnaire des lettres françaises: Le Moyen Age.  Collection: La Pochothèque.  Paris: Fayard, 1992. pp. 106–7.   
Holmes, Jr, Urban Tigner [U.T.].  A History of Old French Literature from the Origins to 1300.  New York: F.S. Crofts, 1938. p. 83.

; volume 2 (1921).

Chansons de geste
French poems
Works based on The Song of Roland
12th-century books
12th-century poems
Epic poems in French
Cultural depictions of Charlemagne